Stellan Österberg (born 17 January 1965) is a Swedish badminton player. He competed in the men's doubles tournament at the 1992 Summer Olympics.

References

External links
 

1965 births
Living people
Swedish male badminton players
Olympic badminton players of Sweden
Badminton players at the 1992 Summer Olympics
People from Härryda Municipality
Sportspeople from Västra Götaland County
20th-century Swedish people